Portrait is a 1982 album by pop group, The Nolans. It featured the UK top 20 singles "Chemistry" and "Don't Love Me Too Hard" and reached No.7 in the album charts. It was released earlier as Don't Love Me Too Hard in Japan with a slightly different track-listing, where it became one of the first 50 albums to be released on Compact disc.

Background

By early 1982, The Nolans had had a run of success in the UK which included three UK top 20 albums and seven top 20 singles as well as achieving major success in Japan. Many of the tracks for this album had been recorded in 1981, but their touring schedule was preventing them from finishing it. With just one day before the deadline, the record company urged the group to work through the night to complete vocals for the remaining tracks. With a cheque for £25,000 to each of them, they did so and Portrait was released in March 1982. Featuring the top 20 hits "Chemistry" and "Don't Love Me Too Hard", the album itself was a success also by reaching No.7 in the album charts. This however signalled the end of their peak, as a third single, "Crashing Down" proved to be aptly titled. The song not only became their first to fail to enter the top 20 this decade, but failed to make the charts at all. Somewhat curiously (and uniquely) it featured on the 'Bubbling Under' section of the chart for five consecutive weeks, without ever entering the top 75. Portrait finished as one of the top 100 selling albums of 1982 in the UK and was certified gold by the BPI.

The album, like its predecessor, was produced by Ben Findon and Nicky Graham separately. Both producers were now giving the songs a heavy disco sound such as "Don't Let it Go By" (by Findon) and "Chemistry" (by Graham). For this album, a third producer was added, Robin Smith, who was Coleen's boyfriend at the time. Two of the songs were co-written by member and lead-singer Bernie Nolan ("Are You Thinking of Me" and "Every Little Thing"), while closing track "Amy" was written for (former member) Anne's daughter, to whom the album was also dedicated. The album was a hit also in their biggest market, Japan, where it had been released as Don't Love Me Too Hard some months prior to the UK. A fourth single was released there also; "How Do I Survive" (which had been a big hit for Amy Holland in 1980 from her self-titled debut album). The album was significant in that it became one of the first 50 pop albums ever to be released on Compact disc, when it was released on the format in Japan in October 1982.

The album was later re-released on CD with bonus tracks in September 2010 by Cherry Red Records.

Track listing

Chart performance

References

External links 
 
 

The Nolans albums
1982 albums
Epic Records albums